The Louisiana meridian, in longitude 92° 24′ 15″ west of Greenwich, extends from the Gulf of Mexico to the north boundary of Louisiana, and with the baseline through the initial point conforming to the parallel of 31° north latitude, governs all the surveys in the state west of the Mississippi River.

Sources

See also
List of principal and guide meridians and base lines of the United States

External links

Meridians and base lines of the United States
Named meridians
Geography of Louisiana